South Dakota Highway 471 (SD 471) is a  state highway in western Fall River, South Dakota, United States, that  connects Highway 71 (SD 71), southeast of Rumford, with U.S. Route 18 (US 18), in Edgemont.

Route description
SD 471 begins at a junction with SD 71 in the Oglala National Grassland. The highway travels northwest through the community of Rumford before turning west and passing through Provo. Here, SD 471 veers north and enters the city of Edgemont as 3rd Street before turning into 2nd Avenue. The designation continues west onto A Street, passing through Edgemont before briefly turning north on 6th Avenue to terminate at US 18.

Legal description
The legal description of SD 471 has been codified by the South Dakota Legislature:
31-4-244. State Highway 471 from State Highway 71 to U.S. Highway 18. The state trunk highway system includes the following in Fall River County:
From a point on State Highway 71 north of Ardmore near the southeast corner of section eight, township eleven south, range four east, thence northwest via Edgemont to a point on U.S. Highway 18 in Edgemont in the southwest quarter of section thirty-six, township eight south, range two east.

Traffic
In 2018, the South Dakota Department of Transportation (SDDOT) measured the amount of traffic on its highways in average annual daily traffic. SD 471 had an average of 79 vehicles along its southern section (south of Fort Igloo Road [north of Provo]), an average of 200 vehicles along its mid section (between Fort Igloo Road and A Street in Edgemont), and an average of 1,012 vehicles along A Street in Edgemont.

National Highway System
SD 471 is not part of the National Highway System (NHS), a system of highways important to the nation's defense, economy, and mobility.

History
SD 471 was designated in 1976. It was previously a portion of Highway 52, which had been used on this route from 1951 to 1975.

Major intersections

See also

 List of state highways in South Dakota

References

External links

 South Dakota Highways Page: Highways 201-1806

471
Transportation in Fall River County, South Dakota